WEEM-FM (91.7 FM) is a student-run high school radio station of Pendleton Heights High School in Pendleton, Indiana. It broadcasts in the CHR music format. The station is owned by South Madison Community School Corporation and is operated by students at Pendleton Heights High School.

Broadcasting information

Awards
2012: Indiana Association of School Broadcasters Radio School Of The Year
2016: Intercollegiate Broadcasting System National High School Radio Station Of The Year

References

External links
South Madison Community School Corporation
91.7 WEEM-FM official website

 Indiana Radio Information

EEM-FM
Radio stations established in 1971
High school radio stations in the United States
Pendleton, Indiana
1971 establishments in Indiana